Zambia News Agency also known as ZANA was the official Zambian news agency.  It was established in 1969, and had its headquarters in Lusaka and branches all over Zambia.  In 2005, ZANA was merged with the Zambia Information Services (ZIS) to form the Zambia News and Information Services (ZANIS), a public relations public media organisation under the Zambian Ministry of Information, Broadcasting Services and Tourism.

References

External links

1969 establishments in Zambia
2005 disestablishments in Zambia
Lusaka
News agencies based in Zambia
Government agencies established in 1969
Organizations disestablished in 2005